Thamnolaea is a small genus of passerine birds in the Old World flycatcher family Muscicapidae, consisting of two closely related species. They are native to sub-Saharan Africa, where they occur in monogamous, territorial pairs along lightly wooded escarpments, on inselbergs and in craggy areas. They habitually lift and fan the tail, and have squeaky and fluty calls. They also duet or mimic other bird species. Nesting is undertaken in early summer, and their own nesting material is often placed in the old mud pellet nests of Cecropis swallows. A clutch of typically three brown-speckled eggs is hatched by the female only. Geographic plumage variations are evident in both species. The similarly plumaged Monticola semirufus is no longer included in the genus.

Species
The genus contains the following species:

References

 
Bird genera